Frank Russell Butler (December 28, 1889 – June 10, 1967) was an American film and theatre actor and later an award-winning screenwriter, born in Oxford, Oxfordshire, England to parents Frederick Butler and Sarah Ann Hedges.  His son, Hugo Butler, also became a Hollywood screenwriter.

Career

Theatre
His theatre career included two appearances (1920s–1930s) in Broadway-theatre productions in New York City.

Film work
Butler's film career started with silent films in the early 1920s. He appeared in almost fifty films and wrote more than sixty screenplays. This included the 1937 film Champagne Waltz.

Awards
He co-won, with Frank Cavett, the Academy Award for Best Original Screenplay for the film Going My Way (1944).  Butler had earlier been nominated for an Academy Award for Best Writing (Original Screenplay) twice in the same year, for Road to Morocco and Wake Island, both released in 1942.

Partial filmography

 Behold My Wife! (1920) (acted)
 The Great Moment (1921) (acted)
 The Sheik (1921) (acted)
 Beyond the Rocks (1922) (acted)
 A Tailor-Made Man (1922) (acted)
 My American Wife (1922) (acted)
 The Tiger's Claw (1923) (acted)
 The Call of the Wild (1923) (acted)
 Satan in Sables (1925) (acted)
 Made for Love (1926) (acted)
 30 Below Zero (1926)
 The Honorable Mr. Buggs (1927)
 Flying Elephants (1928) (directed)
 The Big Killing (1928)
 Just Married (1928)
 China Bound (1929)
 Untamed (1929)
 Strictly Unconventional (1930)
 Those Three French Girls (1930)
 Remote Control (1930)
 New Moon (1930)
 This Modern Age (1931)
 When a Feller Needs a Friend (1932)
 College Humor (1933)
 Search for Beauty (1934)
 Babes in Toyland (1934)
 Vagabond Lady (1935)
 Coronado (1935)
 Strike Me Pink (1936)
 The Milky Way (1936)
 The Bohemian Girl (1936)
 The Princess Comes Across (1936)
 Champagne Waltz (1937)
 Waikiki Wedding (1937)
 Paris Honeymoon (1939)
 Never Say Die (1939)
 The Star Maker (1939)
 Road to Singapore (1940)
 I Want a Divorce (1940)
 Rangers of Fortune (1940)
 Road to Zanzibar (1941)
 Aloma of the South Seas (1941)
 My Favorite Blonde (1942)
 Beyond the Blue Horizon (1942)
 Wake Island (1942)
 Road to Morocco (1942)
 Hostages (1943)
 Going My Way (1944)
 A Medal for Benny (1945)
 Incendiary Blonde (1945)
 California (1947)
 Welcome Stranger (1947)
 The Perils of Pauline (1947)
 Golden Earrings (1947)
 Whispering Smith (1948)
 Road to Bali (1952)
 Strange Lady in Town (1955)

References

External links
 
 

1880s births
1967 deaths
American male film actors
American male screenwriters
American male silent film actors
American male stage actors
Best Adapted Screenplay Academy Award winners
20th-century American male actors
British emigrants to the United States
20th-century American male writers
20th-century American screenwriters